Salony Luthra is an Indian actress who works in English, Tamil and Telugu-language films.

Career 
Salony Luthra worked as a theater artiste in Mumbai and Pondicherry. She made her lead film debut with the Tamil-language film Sarabham (2014) starring Naveen Chandra. She landed the role after being selected from a hundred applicants. In the film, she played dual roles as a normal woman and a drug addict. To prepare for the film, she learnt the Tamil language. For the negative character, she watched Hollywood films and hung out with people who smoked. She is also a theatre artiste and has starred in several productions including the Hindi-language adaptation of the novel Blackbird by David Harrower.

She was signed to play a role in Parandhu Sella Vaa and shot for the film in Singapore. However, she left citing differences with the director. She has also featured in several short films including Oliyum Oliyum as a blind street vendor and Kajal as a working woman. In 2018, she starred in the Hollywood films Turned Out and Forbidden as a Spanish woman and an Indian medical student, respectively. She made her Telugu debut with  Bhanumathi & Ramakrishna in which she was paired with Naveen Chandra for a second time. She played an independent woman in the film.

Early life 
Salony was brought up in Shimla, India.

Filmography

Awards and nominations

References

External links 

Actresses in Tamil cinema
Actresses in Telugu cinema
21st-century Indian actresses
Year of birth missing (living people)
Living people